Kahara is a settlement in Nyeri County, Kenya.

Kahara may also refer to:
 Kahara, Jammu and Kashmir, a village and tehsil in India
 Kaharati, a settlement in Kenya's Central Province
 Tomomi Kahara (born 1974), Japanese pop singer

See also
 Kaharan, Iran